Fermor is the name of noble family of Scottish origin.

Notable members 
 Count Villim Villimovich Fermor was an Imperial Russian Army officer best known for leading his country's army at the Battle of Zorndorf during the Seven Years' War, he was born in 1702 in Pskov of Scottish and Lutheran Baltic German descent.
 Count Pavel Fedorovich Fermor(Павел Фермор), (was a Russian Army, Lieutenant general and he was the first principal of the Alexander Military Law Academy from 1867 to 25.12.1875. He served as a major in all campaigns during the Polish November Uprising in 1830 and 1831, and commanded Lithovian Saper battalion during the Battle of Olszynka Grochowska in February 1831.

References

 Millar, Simon & Hook, Adam. Zorndorf 1758: Frederick Faces Holy Mother Russia. Osprey, 2003.
 Szabo, Franz A.J. The Seven Years' War in Europe, 1756–1763. Pearson, 2008.
 Фермор, Павел Федорович // Русский биографический словарь: в 25 томах. — Санкт-Петербург—Москва, 1896–1918.: Pavel Fedorovich Fermor in Russian Biographical Dictionary

Russian noble families
Russian families of Scottish origin